Space music is music that facilitates the experience of contemplative spaciousness.

 Spatial music, music that exploits the physical dimensions of space 
 Space-themed music, music of any genre with themes or lyrics about outer space
 Space Music (album) by Eloy Fritsch
 Space age pop, certain musical styles popular in the 1950s and early 1960s
 Space disco, the fusion of disco music with futuristic themes
 Space rock, a musical genre related to 1970s progressive rock

See also
 Space (disambiguation)
 Cosmic music (disambiguation)